The 1904 German football championship was the second competition to determine the national champion of Germany.

The competition was not fully played, however, as the German Football Association (DFB) aborted it due to a protest by Karlsruher FV. Karlsruhe had protested the fact that matches had not been played on neutral ground as was stipulated by the rules. The DFB had already ignored this rule for financial reasons in the previous year, but this time Karlsruhe argued that some of their players could not travel to the match in Berlin and this had caused Karlsruhe's defeat. As a result, the championship was annulled.

As in the previous season, all champions of local and regional associations were allowed to enter the competition, but clubs from outside Germany were excluded. Eight clubs eventually entered the competition, two more than in the year before.

Qualified teams
The qualified teams:

Competition

Quarter-finals

Semi-finals

Final

Notes

References

External links
German Championship 1903-04 at weltfussball 

German football championship seasons
1
German